Rochester Community High School was formed when the high schools of Rochester and Richland Center combined in 1965. Students in grades 9-12 of the town of Rochester and several of the rural townships of Fulton County attend. The first class of Rochester High School was in 1880, and there have been several different buildings housing the school. The current Rochester Community High School building was designed by Everett Brown Company and opened in the fall of 1965 to the south of the Rochester City Park. Barnhart Field, home of Zebra football, was constructed in the 1970s at the east end of the school campus, and additional wrestling space and a second gymnasium were added later.

Students have the opportunity to take Advanced Placement coursework and exams. The AP participation rate at Rochester Community High School is 24%. Rochester Community High School is the only high school in the Rochester Community School Corporation.

Student Demographic Information
White:  87.5%

Hispanic:  6.3%

Multiracial:  4.0%

Native American:  1.0%

African American: 0.8%

Asian:  0.4%

Free/Reduced Meals: 45.5%

See also
 List of high schools in Indiana

References

External links
RHS website
Zebra Athletics website
Rochester Schools website
DOE info

Public high schools in Indiana
Schools in Fulton County, Indiana
1956 establishments in Indiana